George Jay Gogue (born 1947) is an American educator and 20th President of Auburn University, a position he held from 2007 until his retirement in July 2017 and again in 2019.

Biography
Jay Gogue was born in Waycross, Georgia, U.S. He graduated from Auburn University with a bachelor's degree in 1969, and a Master's degree in 1971. In 1973, he received a PhD in horticulture from Michigan State University.

From 1973 to 1976, he worked for the National Park Service. He also worked as a U.S. army reserve officer. In 1986, he was appointed as associate director of the Office of University Research at Clemson University in South Carolina. He also served as vice-president for research and vice-president and vice-provost for agriculture and natural resources at Clemson from 1988 to 1995. From 1995 to 2000, he served as Provost of Utah State University. He served as President of New Mexico State University from 2000 to 2003. He also served a dual role as chancellor of the University of Houston System and president of the University of Houston from 2003 to 2007. From 2007 to July 2017, he served as president of Auburn University.

Gogue's annual salary in 2013 was $2.5 million, making him the second-highest paid president of a public college in America.

In October 2012 Gogue was elected to the Alabama Academy of Honor by its members. The academy is Alabama's highest honor.

References

Living people
People from Waycross, Georgia
Auburn University alumni
Michigan State University alumni
Utah State University people
Presidents of New Mexico State University
Chancellors of the University of Houston System
Presidents of the University of Houston
Presidents of Auburn University
Clemson University faculty
1947 births
National Park Service personnel